1,4-Diazepine is a diazepine. It is a core element in the structure of benzodiazepines and thienodiazepines.

Diazepines